Nupserha malabarensis is a species of beetle in the family Cerambycidae. It was described by Maurice Pic in 1939.

Varietas
 Nupserha malabarensis var. nilghirica Breuning, 1954
 Nupserha malabarensis var. apicefemoralis Breuning, 1956
 Nupserha malabarensis var. patenigrescens Breuning, 1950

References

malabarensis
Beetles described in 1939